The Hotel Phillips, a historic 217-room hotel located on 12th Street in downtown Kansas City, Missouri, opened in 1931.

The site was formerly occupied by the Glennon Hotel, in which Harry S. Truman operated a haberdashery shop. That hotel was demolished, and the Phillips was constructed at a cost of $1.6 million, opening in February 1931. The 450-room hotel was the tallest in Kansas City, at 20 stories.

The Phillips was listed on the National Register of Historic Places in 1979. It operated for a time in the 1990s as the Radisson Suite Hotel Kansas City. It was bought by Marcus Hotels in 2001 from Wyndham Hotels.

The lobby contains an eleven-foot sculpture of the Goddess of Dawn, created in 1931 by Kansas City sculptor Jorgen Dreyer.

The Phillips is located directly across from the historic Hotel Muehlebach building.

In October 2015, it was announced that The Phillips was purchased by Arbor Lodging Partners. The Phillips was renovated and joined the Curio Collection by Hilton.

External links
Official Site

References

Hotel buildings completed in 1931
Hotels in Kansas City, Missouri
Hotel buildings on the National Register of Historic Places in Missouri
National Register of Historic Places in Kansas City, Missouri